was a daimyō and official of the Tokugawa shogunate during mid-Edo period Japan.

Biography
Inoue Masasada was the second son of the previous daimyō of Hamamatsu Domain, Inoue Masatsune. He became 7th head of the Mikawa-branch of Inoue clan and daimyō of Hamamatsu Domain on his father's death in 1766. In 1769, he was awarded Lower 5th Court Rank and the courtesy title of Kawachi-no-kami.

In 1774, Masasada entered the administration of the Tokugawa shogunate as a Sōshaban (Master of Ceremonies), becoming Jisha-bugyō on May 11, 1781.

Inoue Masasada was married to a daughter of Matsudaira Norisuke, daimyō of Yamagata Domain, but had three other concubines. He died in 1786 at the relatively young age of 33 and was succeeded by his eldest son Inoue Masamoto.

References 
 Papinot, Edmond. (1906) Dictionnaire d'histoire et de géographie du japon. Tokyo: Librarie Sansaisha...Click link for digitized 1906 Nobiliaire du japon (2003)
 The content of much of this article was derived from that of the corresponding article on Japanese Wikipedia.

Fudai daimyo
1754 births
1786 deaths